Conţeşti may refer to several places in Romania:

 Conțești, a commune in Dâmbovița County
 Conțești, a commune in Teleorman County
 Conțești, a village in Davidești Commune, Argeș County
 Conțești, a village in Sascut Commune, Bacău County
 Conțești, a village in Valea Seacă Commune, Iași County